The Paul A. Dever State School, also known as the Myles Standish School for the Mentally Retarded is a former state school located in Taunton, Massachusetts, at the former site of Camp Myles Standish. It was turned into a school for the mentally disabled in 1959.  At this time, the name was changed to the Paul A. Dever State School, after the Governor of the Commonwealth of Massachusetts from 1949–1953, Paul A. Dever.

History
Additionally, a centrally located kitchen was also built with other structures. Much of the facility closed in 1991 due to lawsuits over funding, with the entire facility closing in 2002. About 45 buildings were still standing as of end-2012, but the city started tearing down much of the premises and there are only about 10 buildings left in mid-2015, most of which are in heavily deteriorated state. The building is often used for police training, which is the cause of paintball splatters inside.

Recent Activity 
April 15, 2009-Four of six suspected teens were arraigned in Taunton District Court for being accused of setting fires to Dever on January 2, 2009. “The incident occurred just before 8 p.m. at an abandoned residential building. A security officer reported a fire at the two-story structure commonly known as House #32, and it was quickly extinguished upon the arrival of Taunton fire personnel." The teens were expected to have been back in court May 20 for a pretrial hearing.
November 27, 2009-There were more suspicions of arson on Dever’s grounds when a few fires had broken out and completely destroyed one of the buildings. “The Dever school property contains a number of empty buildings that through the years have either been vandalized or set afire by arsonists.” The interior markings inside one building even suggest that it was home to a paintball game a short time after its abandonment.
December 13, 2009-Another fire had broken out. "The latest fire was reported at 9:30 p.m. and caused minor damage to an empty one-story building, according to Deputy Fire Chief Michael Sylvia — who also said that the blaze originated in the front entry area of what years ago was known as a Brigadier’s Quarters.", the arsonist got away on what authorities said was a dirt bike.
September 2012- Another fire had broken out.
May 27, 2013 - Major fire (3-alarm equivalent) http://www.myfoxboston.com/story/22429979/2013/05/27/fire-breaks-out-in-taunton
September 9, 2015 - Majority of the building have been torn down, 10 or less remaining now. Construction has begun on new warehouses.
October 1, 2015 - The School has been mostly demolished and is being used for an expansion of the Miles Standish industrial park, one of the most profitable industrial parks in Massachusetts.
 As of late 2016, none of the abandoned buildings remain.

See also 
Camp Myles Standish
Paul A. Dever

References

Notes
 "FAQ." 2007. The Dever Association for the Retarded, Inc. December 2009 <https://archive.today/20041010154347/http://www.deverfamilies.org/faq.html>.
 Lopes, Ashley. "Dever State School." 15 April 2009. Opacity. December 2009 <http://www.opacity.us/article104_teens_arraigned_on_dever_arson_charges.htm>.
 Winokoor, Charles. "Arson Suspected In Dever School Fire." 14 December 2009. Taunton Daily Gazette. December 2009 <http://www.tauntongazette.com/news/x819334014/Arson-suspected-in-Dever-school-fire>.
 —. "Fire Destroys Paul A. Dever Building." 27 November 2009. Taunton Daily Gazette. December 2009 <http://www.tauntongazette.com/news/x1792915250/Fire-destroys-Paul-A-Dever-building>.

Sources

External links 
 https://archive.today/20041010154347/http://www.deverfamilies.org/faq.html

1952 establishments in Massachusetts
2002 disestablishments in Massachusetts
Buildings and structures in Taunton, Massachusetts
Defunct schools in Massachusetts
Demolished buildings and structures in Massachusetts
Demolished school buildings and structures in the United States
Educational institutions disestablished in 2002
Educational institutions established in 1952
Schools in Bristol County, Massachusetts